Bromelton railway station was located on the NSW North Coast line in Queensland, Australia. It served the rural locality of Bromelton.

Platforms and services
Bromelton was served by a northbound XPT service to Roma Street and a southbound service to Sydney until it closed in 1994.

References

Railway stations in Australia opened in 1930
Railway stations closed in 1994
Regional railway stations in Queensland
1994 disestablishments in Australia
Scenic Rim Region